The Housekeeper's Instructor was a bestselling English cookery book written by William Augustus Henderson, 1791. It ran through seventeen editions by 1823. Later editions were revised by Jacob Christopher Schnebbelie.

The full title was "The housekeeper's instructor; or, universal family cook. Being a full and clear display of the art of cookery in all its various branches." Later editions had longer subtitles.

Book

Approach

The recipes are in eighteenth-century style brief, often with no guidance on the techniques to be applied, and with little indication of quantities, cooking temperature or cooking time. There are no lists of ingredients, these being indicated simply by being mentioned in the text. For example, in the section on "Boiling Meat" is the recipe for "Pickled Pork":

The making of components such as pastry, used in many dishes, is described, in its case under the heading of "Pies". First some general advice is given:

A selection of pastry recipes immediately follows, such as:

Illustrations

The book has a frontispiece, which in later editions consists of a large medallion of J.C. Schnebbelie above a representation of The Albany hotel, London, where according to the title page he was principal cook of Martelli's restaurant. The early editions instead showed something much closer to the title: a busy kitchen, with an array of pots and implements, and a man reading from the book itself, shown open on a table, instructing with his pointing finger the man next to him, who is carving some meat on an oval dish. Just in case this recursive allusion were not clear, the "Explanation" caption below the image states that it shows "a Lady presenting her Servant with The Universal Family Cook who diffident of her own knowledge has recourse to that Work for Information."

There are no woodcuts integrated with the text, nor any illustrations of utensils or made dishes.

Illustrations are provided only towards the end of the book: firstly for the Carving chapter, which has seven whole-page copperplate engravings showing somewhat diagrammatically with labels and dotted lines how fowls, game, meat and fish are to be carved; and secondly in the "Suppers" appendix, which has two whole-page and two fold-out engravings illustrating the layout of dishes for first and second courses. Some table layouts are printed in ordinary text, the images of "frames" for table centres fashioned of letters and symbols in ASCII art style.

Contents

The following refer to the sixteenth edition of 1810.

 Introduction 3
 1. Soups and Broths 5
 2. Boiling in General 26
 3. Roasting in General 45
 4. Baking 58
 5. Broiling 64
 6. Frying 71
 7. Stewing 79
 8. Hashing and Mincing 91
 9. Fricasseeing 96
 10. Ragoos 102
 11. Gravies, Cullises, and other Sauses 112
 12. Made Dishes 121
 13. Vegetables and Roots 157
 14. Puddings 162
 15. Pies 179
 16. Pancakes and Fritters 196
 17. Tarts and Puffs 202
 18. Cheesecakes and Custards 207
 19. Cakes, Biscuits &c. 212
 20. The Art of Confectionary 221
 21. Pickling 261
 22. Collaring 278
 23. Potting 283
 24. Curing various kinds of Meats, Sousings, &c. 290
 25. Methods of Keeping Vegetables, Fruits, &c. 298
 26. Possets, White-Pots, Gruels, &c. 302
 27. Made Wines 307
 28. Cordial Waters 320
 29. The Art of Brewing 325
 30. Directions for Trussing Poultry 344
 31. The Complete Market-Woman 350
 32. The Art of Carving 362
 The Housekeeper's Calendar 375
 Suppers 387
 Supplement 388
 Addenda 446
 Index 449

Reception
The Housewife's Instructor was a bestselling book.
'Henderson' was the first named source used for Historic Food's "Regency Cookery Course" in 2003.
The cookery writer "The Old Foodie" observes that the book devotes a whole section to food for long voyages, including detailed instructions for preserving calorie-providing dripping, and is amused by Henderson's "suggestion to minimise its pilfering by rats!", namely "It is a very good maxim to keep the pot upside down, to prevent its being destroyed by the rats. It will keep good any voyage, and make as fine puff-pafte crust as any butter whatever."

Editions

 1st edition, 1791.
 5th edition, 1793.
 8th edition, 1800.
 11th edition
 12th edition, 1804.
 14th edition, 1807.
 15th edition, 1809.
 16th edition, 1810.
 17th edition, 1811.

Notes

References

1790 books
English cuisine
British cookbooks